Avidanalla Vijayapuram is a village in the Orathanadu taluk of Thanjavur district, Tamil Nadu, India.

Demographics 

As per the 2001 census, Avidanalla Vijayapuram had a total population of 2594 with 1256 males and 1338 females. The gender ratio was 1065, and the literacy rate was 70.34.

References 

 

Villages in Thanjavur district